Blace (Cyrillic: Блаце) is a village in the municipality of Konjic, Bosnia and Herzegovina.

Blace village (1,215 m) is located in close proximity to the Blatačko Lake on a karstic plateau of the Bjelašnica mountain, on the very edge of the Rakitnica canyon.

National monument
Blace In combination with lake's natural position. and surrounding space's rich cultural-historical heritage, with prehistoric grave mounds, medieval necropolises with stećak and nišani tombstones, in and around the village, forming one combined cultural landscape with part of the deep Rakitnica canyon, and is designated as a National Monument of Bosnia and Herzegovina.

Demographics 
According to the 2013 census, its population was nil, down from 21 in 1991.

References

Populated places in Konjic
National Monuments of Bosnia and Herzegovina
Upper Neretva